Southport High School is a public high school located in Indianapolis, Indiana, United States.  Located in Perry Township, on the south side of the city, Southport is a part of the Perry Township Schools.

Demographics
The demographic breakdown of the 2,191 students enrolled for 2016-17 was:
Male - 51.0%
Female - 49.0%
Native American/Alaskan - >0.1%
Asian - 18.6%
Black - 6.0%
Hispanic - 14.7%
White - 54.6%
Multiracial - 6.1%

59.0% of the students were eligible for free or reduced-cost lunch. For 2016–17, Southport was a Title I school.

Athletics
The Southport Cardinals compete in Conference Indiana. The school colors are cardinal red and white. The following Indiana High School Athletic Association (IHSAA) sanctioned sports are offered:

Baseball (boys)
Basketball (girls and boys) 
Girls state champion - 1980
Cross country (girls and boys)
Boys state champion - 1970, 1971, 1975
Girls state champion - 1981
Football (boys)
Golf (girls and boys) 
Soccer (girls and boys) 
Softball (girls)
Swimming and diving (girls and boys) 
Tennis (girls and boys) 
Track and field (girls and boys) 
Unified track and field (co-ed)
Volleyball (girls and boys)
Wrestling (boys)
State champion - 1940, 1951, 1954, 1955, 1964

Notable alumni
 Louie Dampier – National Basketball Association player
 Chuck Klein – Major League Baseball player
 Terry Lester – actor
 Chris Lytle – mixed martial artist
 Robin Miller – motorsports journalist
 Cameron Perkins – Major League Baseball outfielder

See also
 List of high schools in Indiana
 Old Southport High School, the school's former building

References

External links

Metropolitan School District of Perry Township

Educational institutions established in 1890
Schools in Indianapolis
Public high schools in Indiana
1890 establishments in Indiana